1,2,3-Triazole is one of a pair of isomeric chemical compounds with molecular formula CHN, called triazoles, which have a five-membered ring of two carbon atoms and three nitrogen atoms. 1,2,3-Triazole is a basic aromatic heterocycle.
  
Substituted 1,2,3-triazoles can be produced using the azide alkyne Huisgen cycloaddition in which an azide and an alkyne undergo a 1,3-dipolar cycloaddition reaction.

It is a surprisingly stable structure compared to other organic compounds with three adjacent nitrogen atoms. However, flash vacuum pyrolysis at 500 °C leads to loss of molecular nitrogen (N) leaving a three-member aziridine ring. Certain triazoles are relatively easy to cleave due to ring–chain tautomerism. One manifestation is found in the Dimroth rearrangement.

1,2,3-Triazole finds use in research as a bioisostere in medicinal chemistry building block for more complex chemical compounds, including pharmaceutical drugs such as mubritinib and tazobactam.

The 2H-1,2,3-triazole tautomer is the major form in aqueous solution.

References

Triazoles